Importin subunit alpha-7 is a protein that in humans is encoded by the KPNA6 gene.

Nucleocytoplasmic transport, a signal- and energy-dependent process, takes place through nuclear pore complexes embedded in the nuclear envelope. The import of proteins containing a nuclear localization signal (NLS) requires the NLS import receptor, a heterodimer of importin alpha and beta subunits also known as karyopherins. Importin alpha binds the NLS-containing cargo in the cytoplasm and importin beta docks the complex at the cytoplasmic side of the nuclear pore complex. In the presence of nucleoside triphosphates and the small GTP binding protein Ran, the complex moves into the nuclear pore complex and the importin subunits dissociate. Importin alpha enters the nucleoplasm with its passenger protein and importin beta remains at the pore. The protein encoded by this gene is a member of the importin alpha family.

References

Further reading

External links 
 

Armadillo-repeat-containing proteins